Lucy Williams (born 6 April 1976) is a Paralympic swimming competitor from Australia.  She was born in Sydney, New South Wales.  She won a bronze medal at the 2000 Sydney Games in the Women's 100 m Breaststroke SB6 event.

References

Female Paralympic swimmers of Australia
Swimmers at the 2000 Summer Paralympics
Paralympic bronze medalists for Australia
1976 births
Living people
Medalists at the 2000 Summer Paralympics
Paralympic medalists in swimming
Australian female breaststroke swimmers
Australian female medley swimmers
Swimmers from Sydney
S6-classified Paralympic swimmers